Hkaru Bum, is a high mountain located in Kachin State, Burma.

Geography
Hkaru Bum is part of a range running from north to south west of the N'Mai River.

The nearest village is Khaunglanhpu, located about 22 km to the ESE.

See also
List of Ultras of Tibet, East Asia and neighbouring areas
List of mountains in Burma

References

External links
Google Books, The Physical Geography of Southeast Asia

Geography of Kachin State
Mountains of Myanmar